Visitors to Belize require a visa unless they come from one of the visa-exempt countries. All visitors are required to have sufficient funds, US$75 per day, and documents required for their next destination.

Visa policy map

Visa exemption 
Holders of passports and refugee travel documents issued by the following 107 jurisdictions do not require a visa to visit Belize.

1 - up to 30 days.
2 - up to 90 days.
3 - up to 180 days.
4 - including all classes of British nationality.

Holders of diplomatic or official passports of Cuba, Haiti and India do not require a visa.

Clearance required 
In addition to a visa, citizens of the following countries require clearance:

Repatriation fee 
Citizens of the following countries must pay a repatriation fee of (unless otherwise noted) BZ$1,200 (equivalent of US$600) upon arrival:

Visa alternatives
Permanent residents and holders of multiple entry visa of the United States and Canada may enter visa-free. 
Passengers with a valid visa issued by a Schengen Member State are visa exempt for a maximum stay of 90 days.

2020 pandemic travel restrictions
During the COVID-19 pandemic, entry was not allowed for persons who had previously visited China.

Visitor statistics
Most visitors arriving to Belize were from the following countries of nationality:

See also

 Visa requirements for Belizean citizens

References

Belize
Foreign relations of Belize